is a 1974 historical film starring Yoshio Harada, Yūsaku Matsuda, Renji Ishibashi, and Kaori Momoi, and directed by Kazuo Kuroki. It is based on the true story of the assassination of Sakamoto Ryōma.

Plot
The film details the last three days of Ryōma's life.

Production
The film is black and white.

Cast

References

External links

1974 films
Films directed by Kazuo Kuroki
Jidaigeki films
Samurai films
Films set in Bakumatsu　
Films set in Kyoto
Japanese historical films
1970s historical films
1970s Japanese films